Matthew Kempshall born (1964) is a British historian who specialises in the history of medieval intellectual thought. He is Lecturer and Tutor  of Medieval History at Oxford University, as well as a tutor and Keeper of the Gardens at Wadham College.

His main interests are in the 'reception of Aristotle's ethical and political ideas, on the connections between Ciceronian rhetoric and medieval historiography, on the ideology of medieval kingship, and on the understanding of classical republicanism by scholastic theologians and early renaissance humanists'. Most recently he has published Rhetoric and the Writing of History (Manchester 2011). According to WorldCat, the book is held in 196  libraries

Books 
 Kempshall, Matthew S. 1999. The common good in late medieval political thought. Oxford: Clarendon press.  
 Kempshall, M. S. 2011. Rhetoric and the writing of history, 400-1500. Manchester: Manchester University Press.  
 McGrade, A.S., John Kilcullen, and Matthew Kempshall. 2001.  (co-editors)The Cambridge translations of medieval philosophical texts. Vol. 2,  Ethics and political philosophy. Cambridge, UK [etc.]: Cambridge University Press.

References

Living people
British historians
Year of birth missing (living people)